Varennes-sur-Fouzon is a former commune in the Indre department in central France. On 1 January 2016, it was merged into the new commune of Val-Fouzon.

Population

See also
Communes of the Indre department

References

Former communes of Indre